is a 1994 Japanese animated science fantasy film which premiered in Japan on March 12, 1994, based on the 14th volume of the same name of the Doraemon Long Stories series. This film marks the 15th anniversary of the Doraemon television series on TV Asahi. It's the 15th Doraemon film.

Plot 

Tired of constantly having nightmares, Nobita asks for Doraemon to bring a Dream Machine, which would allow Nobita to dream of anything he wants. After an attempt to dream about the fall of Atlantis fails, he chooses a dream where he is in a fantasy world with inspiration from The Three Musketeers. Doraemon disapproves and gives him a lecture which makes Nobita angry, and he runs away from home. Doraemon searches for Nobita and promises to let him watch the dream of The Three Musketeers. Doraemon sends him to the dream. At the start of the dream, he meets a fairy who brings him to a city in the Kingdom of Yumirume under the attack of Emperor Odrome's army. Enemies start firing at Nobita, only to be saved by the fairy. She cuts off the piece of the moon, causing Nobita to blow away. When he gets up, he finds himself in the forest, and one of the Sherogani swordsmen, namely Suneo, makes him his slave.

On the way, Nobita helps the baby bear to get out of the trap. While moving through the jungle, Nobita is attacked by another swordsman Gian. In order to save him, Suneo fights with Gian, which he loses and he and Nobita have to retreat. Both of the swordsmen move to the inner forest in order to find the Sherogani sword and suit. Both swordsmen climb over the sky-touching tree to get the sword, but Nobita luckily finds the blasted moon, and with its help, he reaches to the top of the tree and gets the sword. In this way, he becomes another swordsman. At the same time, Nobita's mother comes and wakes him. In the school, he found that due to the dream Gian and Suneo are tired.

At night Nobita asks Doraemon to add his friends to his dream. So he puts an antenna to the heads of his sleeping friends. When the dream starts, Nobita gets shocked to see Doraemon in his dream too. Now Gian and Suneo also become a part of his dream. All the friends move into the forest in order to save the attacked city. Abruptly, they got attacked by a bear, only to be saved by the baby bear, who tells the bear that Nobita saved him from the trap. The bear promised the group to take them to the cave of the dragon.

On the other hand, princess Shizukaru disagrees with her father's idea to marry the person who will defeat Emperor Odrome. She runs away from the castle, rides over the break, which takes her away.

In the forest, the bear leads the group to the cave to dragon, but due to the stream of water Nobita, and Doraemon get separated from the other two. Gian and Suneo continue to move. Suddenly the dragon awakens and turns them into stones with his fire breath.

Nobita and Doraemon meet with Princess Shizukaru. All of them got covered in sand due to the falling of sand. Doraemon suggests that in this form, the dragon can not identify them. So they move to the inner cave of the dragon. Nobita screamed to see Gian and Suneo in stoned form. The dragon hears it and attacks Nobita with his fire, but he protects himself with his sword. He cuts the dragon's mustaches with the sword, causing the dragon to faint. When he was at the verge of finishing the dragon, he stops and gets away. All of them agree with Nobita. the dragon regains consciousness, and he tells Nobita that he does not want to turn anyone to stone; he just wants to protect himself. He lets them a bath in his perspiration which will grant them one more time to live. He also turns Gian and Suneo into normal humans.

Then they move toward the attacked city. The city was empty. They found the army men at the castle. All of them plan to destroy the enemy's army by water as they were made of sand. So all of the army men get dissolved in water. Odrome gets furious at that. He decides to fight with Nobita himself. So he finishes Nobita one time. The other time he tries to finish him, Nobita and Doraemon get awakened by their mother, causing the dream to stop.

Doraemon and Nobita decide to finish the dream. He removes the antenna from all of his friends except for Shizuka, who was bathing. At night when Nobita and Doraemon were going to sleep, the fairy from the start of the dream came and took them to the dream again. This time still fighting with Odrome. Odrome finishes the Shizuka one time as he does not know that she can regain life one more time. Nobita and Odrome continue to fight each other. Nobita keeps the edge of the sword toward Odrome. At the same time, Shizuka uses big light on the sword, which moves across the body of Odrome, causing him to die. The film ends with princess Shizukaru agreeing to marry Nobita. After that, the film cuts to a short scene, where Nobita and Shizuka go to school, remembering their dreams, with Nobita running behind Shizuka when she tells him that he looked smart in the dream.

Cast

References

External links 
 Doraemon The Movie 25th page 
  

1994 films
1994 anime films
Nobita's Three Visionary Swordsmen
Films directed by Tsutomu Shibayama
Films scored by Shunsuke Kikuchi
Animated films about cats
Robot films
Films set in France
Films about dreams
Japanese children's fantasy films
1990s children's animated films